CNP Assurances S.A. is a major French insurance corporation. CNP stands for Caisse Nationale de Prévoyance. It is listed on the Fortune Global 500. The company was formed in 1959 as a subsidiary of Caisse des dépôts et consignations, which continues to hold approximately 40% of the company. Agence des participations de l'État also owned 1.1% for the French State.

Worldwide there are 27 million insured under personal risk and protection policies and 14 million savings and pensions policyholders by the company.

In France, CNP Assurances distributes its individual insurance products through La Banque Postale and the Caisses d’Epargne, as well as through its own CNP Trésor network. In Brazil, its second-largest market, the Group’s partner is Caixa Econômica Federal, the country's second-biggest state-owned bank.

References

External links

Insurance companies of France
Privatized companies of France
Government-owned companies of France
Financial services companies established in 1959
Companies listed on Euronext Paris